The Coba Lake or Lake Coba (Spanish Lago Cobá) is an almost circular lake close to the ancient Maya city of Coba on the Yucatán peninsula.

The lake is surrounded by a reed zone that hosts crocodiles. There is a zip line installation that crosses part of the lake.

A lake of similar size and shape, Lake Makanxoc, lies close to the east.

References

Lakes of Mexico
Landforms of Quintana Roo